Walter Hugh Albaugh (January 2, 1890 – January 21, 1942) was an American lawyer and politician who served two months as a U.S. Representative from Ohio in 1938 and 1939.

Life and career
Born in Phoneton, Ohio, Albaugh attended both the public and high schools of his native city. He worked as a civil engineer where he surveyed fuel lands in Ohio and West Virginia from 1910 until 1911. He went on to graduate from the law department of Ohio State University in Columbus, Ohio in 1914, and was admitted to the bar the same year whereupon he commenced practice in Troy, Ohio.

World War I
During the First World War he served in the United States Infantry as a private, unassigned, from May 28, 1918, until December 13, 1918.

Political career
After the war, he went on to serve as a member of the State house of representatives from 1921 until 1925.

Albaugh was elected as a Republican to the Seventy-fifth Congress to fill the vacancy caused by the resignation of Frank L. Kloeb, and only served from November 8, 1938, until January 3, 1939. He was not a candidate for nomination in 1938 to the next full term.

Albaugh subsequently resumed the practice of law in Troy, Ohio.

Death
He died on January 21, 1942, and is interred in Memorial Park Cemetery, Dayton, Ohio.

Sources

1890 births
1942 deaths
People from Miami County, Ohio
United States Army soldiers
Ohio State University Moritz College of Law alumni
United States Army personnel of World War I
Republican Party members of the Ohio House of Representatives
20th-century American politicians
People from Troy, Ohio
Republican Party members of the United States House of Representatives from Ohio